Give the Girl a Spanner was a hit for  Australian singer Kate Cook in 2013. It made it into the top 30 in the Australian country charts.

Background
The inspiration for the song came about when Cook had moved to Rockhampton, and was working as a trades assistant on hydraulic machinery for CAT trucks and vehicles  It was about women finding strength in jobs that men usually did. She co-wrote the song with Allan Caswell.

Chart performance
The song was picking up pace and by October 2013, receiving a good amount of airplay. The song reached No. 3 in the Australian Tracks Top 30 chart.

Awards
The song won her an Australian Independent Music Award. 
The single did well at the Music Oz Awards, being named as the 2013 country single of the year.

References

2013 songs
2013 singles
Songs written by Allan Caswell